Between the Valley of the Ultra Pussy is an album of industrial remixes of Faster Pussycat songs from the late 1980s and early 1990s, released after they reunited for a tour in 2001. Lead singer Taime Downe had always favored industrial rock and had been recording in that style since Faster Pussycat's break-up.

Track listing
 "Arizona Indian Doll"
 "Bathroom Wall"
 "Little Dove"
 "Poison Ivy"
 "Smash Alley"
 "Out with a Bang"
 "Body Thief"
 "House of Pain"
 "Cathouse"
 "Where There's a Whip, There's a Way"
 "Slip of the Tongue"
 "I Was Made for Lovin' You"
 "Blood" (Unreleased demo)

Personnel
Faster Pussycat
 Taime Downe - lead vocals
 Greg Steele - guitar
 Brent Muscat - guitar
 Eric Stacy - bass guitar
 Brett Bradshaw - drums
 Mark Michals - drums

Faster Pussycat albums
2001 compilation albums